"C'mon and Get My Love" is a song by British dance producer D Mob from his only studio album, A Little Bit of This, a Little Bit of That (1989). It features British singer Cathy Dennis, credited as "introducing" her. The song established Dennis as a major chart presence during the late 1980s to early 1990s and was later included in her debut solo album, Move to This, in 1990.

The song peaked at number 15 on the UK Singles Chart. In the United States, "C'mon and Get My Love" is the song most closely identified with D Mob as it crossed over to pop radio, reaching number 10 on the Billboard Hot 100. It also topped the American dance chart, becoming the biggest hit of D Mob's career, and jump-starting Dennis' career as a solo artist. A music video was also created for the song, directed by Marek Budzynski.

Critical reception
Alex Henderson of AllMusic stated that the "more melodic and accessible nature of 'deep house' is evident" on the song. He also declared it as a "very addictive" club hit that features "likeable dance diva" Cathy Dennis. Selina Webb from Music Week wrote, "The trends keep on coming but D-Mob seem to have lost the edge with this one. OK, the catchy bits have been pretty blatant so far, but this girlie-crooned bass pumper needs hefty dancefloor blasting before it catches on. Uplifts the spirits and all that, but too late to inspire."

Music video
The accompanying music video for "C'mon and Get My Love" was directed by Marek Budzynski, and garnered heavy MTV rotation. It depicts D-Mob as a film director on set, with Dennis and two female dancers performing in front of large blue letters that spell out 'D-MOB'. In between, the director and other men on the set also joins in on the dance. Sheila Rogers from Calgary Herald complimented the video as "infectious".

Track listings

 7-inch, mini-CD, and Australasian cassette single
 "C'mon and Get My Love" – 3:50
 "C'mon and Get My Love" (TV mix) – 3:43

 Non-US 12-inch single
A. "C'mon and Get My Love" (Dance Hall mix)
B. "C'mon and Get My Love" (Spaghetti Western mix)

 European CD single
 "C'mon and Get My Love" (7-inch version)
 "C'mon and Get My Love" (Dance Hall mix)
 "C'mon and Get My Love" (Keys II My Love mix featuring Jools Holland)

 US cassette single
A. "C'mon and Get My Love" (7-inch mix) – 3:50
B. "C'mon and Get My Love" (12-inch remix) – 6:15

 US 12-inch single
A1. "C'mon and Get My Love" (Dance Hall mix) – 7:52
A2. "C'mon and Get My Love" (Keys II My Love mix featuring Jools Holland) – 5:20
A3. "C'mon and Get My Love" (7-inch mix) – 3:50
B1. "C'mon and Get My Love" (12-inch remix) – 6:15
B2. "C'mon and Get My Love" (Second Coming mix) – 5:12
B3. "C'mon and Get My Love" (acapella mix) – 3:40

 Canadian 12-inch and maxi-cassette single
A1. "C'mon and Get My Love" (Dance Hall mix) – 7:36
A2. "C'mon and Get My Love" (Keys II My Love mix featuring Jools Holland) – 5:22
A3. "C'mon and Get My Love" (Second Coming mix) – 5:06
B1. "C'mon and Get My Love" (Spaghetti Western mix) – 7:52
B2. "C'mon and Get My Love" (acapella version) – 3:42
B3. "C'mon and Get My Love" (single version) – 3:50

Charts

Weekly charts

Year-end charts

See also
 List of number-one dance hits (United States)

References

1989 singles
1989 songs
Cathy Dennis songs
D Mob songs
FFRR Records singles
Songs written by D Mob